Gilles Létourneau (born July 14, 1945) is a Canadian lawyer/attorney and judge currently serving on the Canadian Federal Court of Appeal and Court Martial Appeal Court of Canada.

Early life and education

Born July 14, 1945, St-Michel, Bellechasse County, Quebec, Justice Létourneau  was educated at Laval University and holds a Ph.D. in Law and Criminal Procedure from the London School of Economics and Political Science.

Academic career and scholarship

Justice Létourneau has served as Vice-Dean, Director of Undergraduate Studies and professor in the Law Faculty of Laval University, and is the author or co-author of over 100 texts, reports or articles connected with the law, legislation, the administration of justice and reform.  Between 1977 and 1985, he served Quebec editor of the Canadian law report "Criminal Reports".

Létourneau serves on the advisory board for The Sedona Conference, a forum dedicated to the advanced study of law and policy.

Judicial career

From 1977 to 1995, Létourneau worked in the Department of Justice in Quebec.  After serving five years as vice-president, Létourneau was appointed President of the Law Reform Commission of Canada  on July 5, 1990.  In 1991, he was appointed Queen's Counsel and on May 13, 1992, Judge of the Federal Court of Canada, Appeal Division and ex officio member of the Trial Division, and Judge of the Court Martial Appeal Court of Canada on May 13, 1992.

On March 20, 1995, he was appointed Chairman of the Commission of Inquiry into the Deployment of Canadian Forces to Somalia and remained on the commission for the duration of its nearly two-year term.

Since July 2, 2003, the date of the coming into force of the Courts Administration Service Act, he is now Judge of the Federal Court of Appeal.

References

http://www.cmac-cacm.ca/bios/letourneau_e.shtml 
https://web.archive.org/web/20110721211758/http://www.journal.dnd.ca/vo8/no3/essay-essai-01-eng.asp

1945 births
Living people
Judges of the Federal Court of Appeal (Canada)
Judges of the Court Martial Appeal Court of Canada
Canadian King's Counsel
Université Laval alumni